Rostamabad (also Romanized as Rostamābād; also known as Shūr Sharābād) is a village in Rigan Rural District, in the Central District of Rigan County, Kerman Province, Iran. At the 2006 census, its population was 516, in 107 families.

References 

Populated places in Rigan County